Aiways Automobiles Company Ltd is a Chinese automobile manufacturer of electric cars founded in 2017. The Aiways name is derived from the phrase "Ai (meaning 'love' in Chinese) is on the way".

History
Aiways was founded by Fu Qiang (Samuel), former China sales chief of Volvo Cars, and Gary Gu in Shanghai in 2017.

In August 2019, Aiways acquired a 50 percent stake in Chinese domestic automaker Jiangling Holdings. Jiangling was relaunched as a 50-25-25 three-way partnership with Aiways, Jiangling Motors Corporation Group and Changan Automobile. Aiways paid 1.75 billion yuan ($248 million) acquiring the stake, according to information disclosed by Changan Automobiles. The deal enables Aiways to obtain a license to produce EVs from China regulators and to use Jiangling's auto production plant to increase output. In June 2021, Aiways sold its JMH stake to Jiangxi Guokong Automotive Investment Corporation, a company controlled by Nanchang's municipality, while keeping the production permits.
 
One of the company's first models, the Aiways U5, was released in November 2018 and has been approved for the EU market.

In January 2021, the company was seeking to raise funds at a price which would value it at over US$2 billion. Aiways also joined Volkswagen Group's -pool.

In November 2022, Aiways and Phoenix EV sign far-reaching agreement in South-East Asia.

Sales strategy 
Sales of the vehicles produced in Shangrao started in December 2019 in China. In Europe, the first models are due to hit the stores in mid-2020. Instead of being carried by ship, the vehicles are to be transported by train, which should reduce the transport time from six weeks to 16 days. The vehicles are to be sold in Germany via Euronics Deutschland, a cooperative chain of independent consumer electronics and white goods retailers. Maintenance and spare parts logistics are to be carried out by the cooperation partner A.T.U.

Facilities 
The company has Global headquarters in Shanghai, China plus European headquarters and R&D centre in Munich, Germany.

Shangrao Production Base 
Aiways invested ¥13.3 billion in building a factory in Shangrao. The factory is engineered to Industry 4.0 standards and uses a cloud-based monitoring system developed by Siemens. The plant operates using products from Swiss-Swedish robotics supplier, ABB,  which deliver 90% automation across the plant. In the body shop, robots supplied by German company Kuka join the chassis components and body panels.

The paint shop was built by German plant manufacturer Eisenmann and the assembly shop was erected by German manufacturing specialists Durr.

The factory currently produces the Aiways U5 and will be able to produce 300,000 vehicles per year when operating at full capacity.

Battery Production Factory 
In 2018 Aiways started producing battery packs at its plant in Changshu, Jiangsu, China. The factory produces Aiways' patented ‘sandwich’ structure battery pack which is used in the Aiways U5 and U6 models.

Notable Technology 

 Battery pack with sandwich structure – the pack is made of 24 high energy density modules supplied by CATL. The battery and electronics were designed in house at Aiways. The sandwich battery structure gets its name from the multi-layer protection separating dry and wet areas within the cell. 
 More Adaptable Structure (MAS) platform – U5 and U6 are built on a modular and scalable vehicle platform  which allows for the fitment of different powertrains

Notable Safety Features 
Aiways vehicles come with various Advanced Driver Assistance Systems (ADAS) as standard including:

 Emergency Brake Assist (EBA) automatically applies the car's brakes when a pedestrian, cyclist of vehicle passes in front of the car.
 Lane Keeping Assist (LKA) - Between 60 km/h and 120 km/h the system warns the driver if they are about to stray from their lane and makes necessary adjustments to the steering if the driver does not. It also makes an audible warning if the driver's hands are off the steering wheel for more than eight second
 Blind Spot Detection – alerts the driver with a sound and a light if a vehicle or cyclist is passing in the vehicles blind spot
 Forward Collision Warning – detects vehicles and pedestrians in front of the car and sounds an alarm if approaching at more than 10 km/h
 Rear Cross Traffic Alert – warns the driver when a vehicle is about to pass behind the car

Production Vehicles

Aiways U5 
Aiways' first vehicle is the 4.68m long electric CUV Aiways U5. It was presented at the Geneva Motor Show in March 2019 and was launched in China in December 2019. Exports from China began in 2020 and the U5 is now sold in Belgium, Denmark, France, Germany, Israel, Italy, La Reunion, Suisse (Garage Emplatures) and the Netherlands

In 2021 the U5 was given a ‘facelift’ which included new convenience technology features, new paint colors and a new 63kWh battery.

Aiways U6 
The Aiways U6 will be the second zero-emission electric vehicle made by Aiways and will go into production in China in September 2021. The aerodynamic design of the U6 is heavily influenced by the U6 ion concept, its design sitting somewhere between coupe and more traditional crossover. The U6 will go on sale in China by the end of 2021 and in Europe at the beginning of 2022.

Concept Vehicles

Aiways U6 ion 
The manufacturer's concept car Aiways U6 ion, which was to be presented at the Geneva Motor Show 2020, as an SUV Coupé. Due to the COVID-19 virus pandemic the vehicle could not be delivered from China to Europe. Regardless, the debut was expected to take place remotely through a live conference at the Geneva Motor Show in Geneva, Switzerland. As the Swiss government banned events with more than 1,000 participants on 28 February 2020 due to the epidemic, the Geneva Motor Show was canceled. The planned press conference finally took place on 3 March 2020 in Leonberg.

Aiways U7 ion 
The Aiways U7 ion concept car was unveiled at Auto Shanghai in 2019 to demonstrate the companies ‘FRM’ concept (family, roomy mobility). It featured a self-learning robot which can move around the vehicle and smart mobile console with touch screen that can move around the cabin.

Supply Chain Partners 
Aiways works with various technology suppliers from Europe to manufacture its range of vehicles.

 Robert Bosch  – supplies the electric power steering in the U5
 Benteler Automotive – developed the U5's body in white  from an aluminium and steel mix
 Georg Fischer – provides the bonding, casting and forming techniques that make the U5 body 50% stiffer than the equivalent steel body
 Autoneum  – interior materials and upholstery
 Grupo Antolin  – interior materials and upholstery

Gumpert Aiways Automobile 

Gumpert Aiways Automobile was a subsidiary based in Ingolstadt, Germany, which is managed by Roland Gumpert. The methanol fueled vehicle Gumpert Nathalie was the first model of this company.

References

External links 

 Official website

 
Chinese brands
Car brands
Car manufacturers of China
Luxury motor vehicle manufacturers
Chinese companies established in 2017
Vehicle manufacturing companies established in 2017
Manufacturing companies based in Shanghai